Praça do Relógio is a Federal District Metro brazilian station on Green line. It was opened on 31 March 2001 as the western terminus of the inaugural section of the line, from Central to Praça do Relógio. In November 2006, the line was extended to Ceilândia Sul as shuttle service, and on 23 April 2007, full service was opened. It is located between Estrada Parque and Centro Metropolitano.

References

Brasília Metro stations
2001 establishments in Brazil
Railway stations opened in 2001